Margit Tóth (27 October 1961 – 18 December 2016) was a Hungarian artistic gymnast. She competed at the 1976 Summer Olympics. Born in Dunaújváros in 1961, Tóth died in 2016 at the age of 55.

References

External links
 
 
 

1961 births
2016 deaths
Olympic gymnasts of Hungary
Gymnasts at the 1976 Summer Olympics
Hungarian female artistic gymnasts
People from Dunaújváros